Red-headed pine sawfly is a common name for several insects and may refer to:

Acantholyda erythrocephala, native to Europe and introduced to North America
Neodiprion lecontei, native to North America

Insect common names